Alfred Hancock Witherow (25 February 1872 – 10 September 1948) was a New Zealand-born Fijian politician who served as a member of the Legislative Council between 1908 and 1911.

Biography
Witherow was born in Hawke's Bay in New Zealand. He emigrated to Fiji in 1894 and initially grew sugar cane in Rewa. He later switched to growing bananas and became a major exporter to Australia and New Zealand, before concentrating on dairy farming. He married Lily Bailey in 1904, with whom he had two sons and four daughters.

In the 1908 general elections he contested the Planters seat and was elected to the Legislative Council. He did not run in the next elections in 1911.

Witherow died at his home in Waila in Rewa in September 1948 at the age of 76.

References

1872 births
People from the Hawke's Bay Region
New Zealand emigrants to Fiji
Fijian farmers
Members of the Legislative Council of Fiji
1948 deaths